Minder on the Orient Express is a comedy/thriller television film made in 1985 as a spin-off from the successful television series Minder. It was first broadcast on Christmas Day 1985, as the highlight of that year's ITV Christmas schedule.

Plot
When Nikki South (Amanda Pays) inherits the contents of a bank strongbox left by her father shortly before his death in 1975, former gangland boss Jack South, she realises that the contents form a clue to the number of a Swiss bank account used to stash her father's ill-gotten gains - an idea possibly derived from the money supposedly left in a secret account by Diana Dors.

Nikki is waylaid on her way to her birthday party. The masked attackers try to wrest the clues, kept in an envelope, from her, but she is rescued by Terry (Dennis Waterman), who is working as a temporary doorman at the club where the party is to be held. She later thanks him by presenting him with two return tickets for the Orient Express to Venice. Terry, not realising Nikki has an ulterior motive for inviting him, plans to take Annie, his current girlfriend who also works at the club, with him.

Nikki plans to travel to Switzerland with her boyfriend Mark (James Coombes) on the same train to claim the contents. But others have their eyes on the potential windfall, especially several former associates of her father. They include a bent bank manager (Maurice Denham), a hitman (Adam Faith) and the widow of a former associate (Honor Blackman).

Arthur (George Cole) is on the run. He's been a reluctant witness to a protection racket attack and Detective Sergeant Rycott (Peter Childs) is trying to serve a subpoena on him to testify in court against violent gangster, Brian "Brain Damage" Gammidge. Arthur persuades Terry's girlfriend that Terry's (non-existent) wife and children have arrived unexpectedly, and when she angrily dumps him, Arthur turns up at the railway station and brazenly persuades a furious Terry to take him along, thus evading the subpoena.

As they travel towards Folkestone, Nikki enlists Terry's help again, as the former associates try to get the envelope off her. They also discover that Arthur's other nemesis, Detective Sergeant Chisholm (Patrick Malahide), is also travelling on the train, having been seconded to Interpol alongside Interpol agent Sergeant Francois LeBlanc (Ralph Bates) to observe the various 'faces'.

As the train travels through night-time France, matters eventually come to a head and a free-for-all scrap ensues. Even Chisholm joins in the fight, upholding the honour of the police in the face of an easy-going and slightly drunk French detective. As the train comes to a halt following the pulling of the emergency cord, Arthur, Terry and Nikki get off the train, to be joined by Chisholm.

Nikki and Terry complete the cracking of the code to the bank account number (players' shirt numbers from the 1971 Arsenal F.C. FA Cup match), but following a fight with two of the villains on a local French train, the partial Swiss Bank account number is lost. So there's no pot of gold for anyone and the protagonists return to Fulham Broadway.

Supporting cast
Both George Cole and Johnny Goodman (Executive in Charge of Production) have stated that this is 'probably' their favourite episode of the whole series, and certainly the most fun to make as it had such a diverse supporting cast. Joining the regular cast of Dennis Waterman, George Cole, Glynn Edwards, Patrick Malahide and Peter Childs were a number of high-profile supporting actors. These included:

 Hammer Horror, Poldark and Dear John star Ralph Bates as Interpol detective Francois LeBlanc
Canadian film actor Robert Beatty as The Judge, an American tourist who consistently mistakes Arthur for a waiter
 Avengers and Goldfinger star Honor Blackman as the widow of one of Jack South's henchmen
1960s pop star, film actor and Budgie star Adam Faith as hitman James Crane
Versatile TV and Raiders of the Lost Ark actor Ronald Lacey as Harry Ridler, who used to 'sit on' Jack South's robbery proceeds until "the dust settled"
1970s British sex-comedy actress Linda Hayden as Terry's girlfriend, Annie
Veteran TV and radio actor Maurice Denham as Meredith Gascoigne, another of Jack South's cronies
First Among Equals and Bridget Jones actor James Faulkner as gangster Ted Moore, another South associate
TV and film actress Amanda Pays as Nikki South, Jack South's daughter and sole heiress to his fortune. 
Actress Alexandra Avery plays young Nikki South.
 Howards' Way actor and former Milk Tray Man James Coombes as the son of one of South's henchmen
Musician and comedian Tony Hawks in an uncredited cameo.

References

External links 
 

1980s comedy thriller films
1985 television films
1985 films
Films based on television series
British thriller television films
Minder (TV series) episodes
Films set on the Orient Express
British comedy thriller films
1980s British films
British comedy television films
1980s English-language films